Ervin González (born August 25, 1985 in Villanueva, Guajira) is a Colombian football forward, who currently plays for La Equidad in the Categoría Primera A.

References

External links
Profile at BDFA

1985 births
Living people
Colombian footballers
Association football defenders
Deportivo Pereira footballers
Millonarios F.C. players
Atlético Huila footballers
La Equidad footballers
Association football utility players
People from La Guajira Department